Rushford is a census-designated place comprising the central settlement in the town of Rushford, Allegany County, New York, United States. As of the 2010 census, it had a population of 363, out of a total population of 1,150 in the town.

Geography
The Rushford CDP is located near the center of Rushford, north of Caneadea Creek, a tributary of the Genesee River. New York State Route 243 bypasses the center of the community, forming the northeast edge of the CDP. It leads east  to Route 19 in the Genesee River valley and northwest into Cattaraugus County.

Demographics

References

Hamlets in New York (state)
Census-designated places in Allegany County, New York
Census-designated places in New York (state)
Hamlets in Allegany County, New York